Eteri is a female Georgian name and can refer to:

 Eteri Andjaparidze, Georgian-American pianist
 Eteri Lamoris, Georgian-Spanish singer
 Eteri Liparteliani, Georgian judoka
 Eteri Tutberidze, Georgian-Russian figure skating coach

Georgian feminine given names